The Walker River is a river in the Northern Territory, Australia.

Course
The headwaters of the river are in the Mitchell Ranges and the river flows in a southerly direction between Mount Ramsay and Mount Fleming and through Fairy Glen then down onto a plain then cuts through Bath Range under Mount Rankine and veering eastward. The river then passes the Aboriginal communities of Marrkalawa and Andanangki the past the Coast Range and discharges into Blue Mud Bay and the Gulf of Carpentaria and the Arafura Sea.
   

The estuary formed at the river mouth is in near pristine condition with a tidal delta. It is river dominated in nature with a tide dominated delta with a single channel and is surrounded by an area of  covered with mangroves.

History
The traditional owners of the area are the Nunggubuyu people, who have inhabited the area for thousands of years.

The river was named by the explorer, David Lindsay, during his expedition through Arnhem Land in 1883. Lindsay named it after Thomas Walker, the leader of the Blue Mud Bay prospecting party, who was murdered by Aboriginal people in the area in 1875.

See also

List of rivers of Northern Territory

References

Rivers of the Northern Territory